Baliyan may refer to:
 Baliyan, Eyvan, a village in Evyan County, Ilam Province, Iran
 Baliyan, Ilam, a village in Ilam County, Ilam Province, Iran
 Baliyan (surname)